Projekt Melody, or Melody for short, is a 3D anime-styled live streamer, or VTuber, and pornographic actress. She first appeared when her Twitter account opened in July 2019, and she has live streamed on Chaturbate and Twitch since early 2020. During her first three days of Chaturbate streaming, Melody's Twitter followers rose from 700 to over 20,000, and her sudden rise in popularity had mixed reactions. In late 2020, Melody became a founding member of VShojo, one of the first VTuber talent agencies based in the Western world. She describes herself as an artificial intelligence, although she is performed by a real person.

Overview
DigitrevX, an American animator of anime-style 3D character models for VTubers, was commissioned to create Projekt Melody's original avatar. She is rendered in real time using the game engine Unity. She has purple and blue hair and an adhesive bandage on her nose, and her appearance was influenced by anime such as Ghost in the Shell and Hyperdimension Neptunia.

Melody claims to be an artificial intelligence, with her first appearance in July 2019 on Twitter involving her acting as a broken chat program that progressively developed sentience. She describes herself as "the first ... 3D rendered hentai camgirl."

Live streaming

Chaturbate
Projekt Melody hosted her first stream on Chaturbate on February 7, 2020. During the three days after this stream, her Twitter follower count increased from 700 to more than 20,000. While her streams are in progress, Melody uses a Bluetooth-enabled bullet vibrator that reacts to donations from viewers.

Twitch
On March 7, 2020, Melody made her live streaming debut on Twitch, where she was partnered before her first stream was broadcast. By the stream's end, she had over 50,000 followers.

On March 12, 2020, Twitch issued Melody a three-day suspension. Reddit users speculated on several possible reasons for her Twitch suspension, such as having a vibrator visible on her bed, skin becoming visible under her shirt when it clipped, linking to NSFW content, and hentai publisher Fakku providing sponsorship. On April 7, Twitch updated its nudity and attire policy, establishing new guidelines for acceptable levels of clothing coverage for all streamers on the website, including digital characters like Melody. On November 4, Twitch issued Melody a second suspension due to DigitrevX making a DMCA filing related to a copyright claim over Melody's usage of her model. The suspension was lifted the following day.

On November 24, 2020, Melody announced the launch of VShojo, one of the first Western VTuber talent agencies.

On September 24, 2021, Melody debuted a new Live2D-based character model.

Reception
Projekt Melody's popularity drew criticism from fellow webcam models, who argued that she does not experience the same degree of vulnerability as human models, and questioned if she belonged on Chaturbate. Projekt Melody subreddit moderator "jyl5555" said that fans enjoy the "wittiness and absurdity of Melody as a concept".

See also
Internet celebrity
Ironmouse

References

External links

American animation
Sexuality and computing
Twitch (service) streamers
Virtual influencers
VShojo
Living people
Unidentified people
Year of birth missing (living people)
Animated characters introduced in 2019
Fictional pornographic film actors
Hentai creators
American pornographic film actresses
Fictional pansexuals